Colonial elections were held in South Australia from 8 April to 23 April 1884. All 52 seats in the South Australian House of Assembly were up for election.

The government led by William Morgan was defeated by John Cox Bray only two months after the 1881 election. Bray took the parliament into the 1884 election after a full term.

The election was held on April 8 and 23, and was contested on new boundaries. A redistribution returned to uniform numbers of member per electorate, with twenty six 2-member electorates.

Since the inaugural 1857 election, no parties or solid groupings had been formed, which resulted in frequent changes of the Premier. If for any reason the incumbent Premier of South Australia lost sufficient support through a successful motion of no confidence at any time on the floor of the house, he would tender his resignation to the Governor of South Australia, which would result in another member deemed to have the support of the House of Assembly being sworn in by the Governor as the next Premier.

Informal groupings began and increased government stability occurred from the 1887 election. The United Labor Party would be formed in 1891, while the National Defence League would be formed later in the same year.

See also
Premier of South Australia

Notes

References
History of South Australian elections 1857-2006, volume 1: ECSA
Statistical Record of the Legislature 1836-2007: SA Parliament

Elections in South Australia
1884 elections in Australia
1880s in South Australia
April 1884 events